Moshkovsky District is an administrative and municipal district (raion), one of the thirty in Novosibirsk Oblast, Russia. It is located in the northeast of the oblast. Its administrative center is the urban locality (a work settlement) of Moshkovo. Population: 39,192 (2010 Census);  The population of Moshkovo accounts for 26.1% of the district's total population.

Notable residents 

Pavel Prokudin (born 17 August 1966 in Smolensky, Moshkovsky District), Prime Minister of Transnistria 2015–2016

References

Notes

Sources

Districts of Novosibirsk Oblast